The 2010–11 Scottish Cup was the 126th season of Scotland's most prestigious football knockout competition.

Celtic won the competition after they defeated Motherwell 3–0.

Calendar

From the First Round to the Third Round, postponed or drawn ties were normally replayed on the following weekend and thereafter on consecutive midweeks. From the Fourth Round to the Sixth Round, postponed or drawn ties were normally replayed on the second midweek after the original date, and thereafter on consecutive midweeks. There were no replays in the Semi-Finals or the Final.

First round
The First round draw was conducted on 1 September 2010.

Wick Academy received a bye into the Second Round.

Source: BBC Sport

First round replays
Matches were played on 2 October 2010.
Source: BBC Sport

Second round
The Second round draw was conducted on 29 September 2010.

Source: BBC Sport

Second round replays
Matches were played on 30 October 2010.
Source: BBC Sport

Third round
The third round draw was conducted on 28 October 2010.

Source: BBC Sport

Third round replays

Matches were played on 4 January 2011 with the exception of Threave Rovers v Stenhousemuir which took place on Wednesday 12 January having been postponed for 4 January 5 January, 8 January & 11 January, all the matches were originally scheduled for 27 November then 30 November (postponed due to weather conditions) and 7 December (6 December for Threave Rovers v Stenhousemuir) (again postponed due to weather conditions) and also 14 December again postponed for weather conditions, the Annan match had also been scheduled for the next night following the postponement of the 14 December match. Following this the matches were scheduled for 21 December then 28 December but on both occasions they were again postponed due to the weather conditions.
Source: BBC Sport

Fourth round
The fourth round draw was conducted on 22 November 2010 at 11:30am at Hampden Park live on Sky Sports News and Sky Sports News HD. These ties took place on Saturday 8 January and Sunday 9 January for the Dundee and Berwick Rangers matches with the Rangers tie the following night (Monday 10 January). The Falkirk and Queen of the South ties took place on Tuesday 11 January and the Morton tie took place on Tuesday 18 January after all 3 were postponed for 8 January. Hearts v St Johnstone also took place on 11 January & East Stirlingshire v Buckie Thistle took place on Wednesday 19 January having both been postponed for 9 January and the Stranraer tie took place on Tuesday 18 January following the Threave Rovers v Stenhousemuir replay from the last round being carried over to Wednesday 12 January due to the weather conditions. 
East Stirlingshire defeated Buckie Thistle 1–0 in the fourth round but were expelled due to fielding an ineligible player. Buckie Thistle qualified for the fifth round.

Source: BBC Sport
Buckie Thistle progressed after East Stirlingshire fielded an ineligible player.

Fourth round replays
The Dunfermline tie was originally scheduled for 11 January but was postponed and played on 18 January which was also when the rest of the ties were played except Airdrie v Morton & Stranraer v Stenhousemuir which were played on 25 January.
Source: BBC Sport

Fifth round
The fifth round draw was conducted on Tuesday 11 January 2011 at 2:30pm at Hampden Park live on Sky Sports News and Sky Sports News HD. The ties were played on Saturday, 5 February & Sunday, 6 February, except for the St Johnstone v Partick Thistle match, which was postponed to Tuesday, 8 February due to an unplayable pitch and to Wednesday, 9 February due to snow-covered pitch.

Source: BBC Sport

Fifth round replays

Source: BBC Sport

Quarter-finals
The quarter-final draw was conducted on Sunday 6 February at 2:30pm at Ibrox Stadium live on Sky Sports 2, Sky Sports HD2 & Sky 3D following the 5th round Old Firm tie. The ties were played on Saturday, 12 March and Sunday, 13 March, except for Inverness CT vs Celtic match, which was postponed to Wednesday, 16 March due to waterlogged pitch at Caledonian Stadium.

Source: BBC Sport

Quarter-finals replays

Source: BBC Sport

Semi-finals
The semi-final draw was conducted on Monday, 14 March at Inverclyde National Sports Training Centre at 1pm live on Sky Sports News & Sky Sports News HD. The ties were played on Saturday, 16 April & Sunday, 17 April at Hampden Park.

Source: BBC Sport

Final

Source: BBC Sport

Awards
The Scottish Cup Player of the Round was decided by the fans, who cast their vote to choose a winner from a list of nominations on the official Scottish Cup Facebook page.

Media coverage

UK/Ireland
From Round 4 onwards, selected matches from the Scottish Cup are broadcast live in the UK and Republic of Ireland by BBC Scotland and Sky Sports. BBC Scotland has the option to show one tie per round with Sky Sports showing two ties per round with one replay also. Both channels will screen the final live.

These matches were broadcast live on television.

Overseas
From Round 4 onwards, in the USA and Caribbean Premium Sports showed matches live. Setanta Sports show matches live in Australia.

External links
 Official site
 2010–11 Scottish Cup at ESPN

References

Scottish Cup seasons
1
Scottish Cup